Bellezza (Italian: "beauty") may also refer to:

 Dario Bellezza (1944–1996), Italian poet
 Giovanni Bellezza (1807–1876), Italian sculptor
 Emanuela Bellezza (1984), Italian-American singer
La bellezza, album by Cristiano Malgioglio 2014

See also
Belleza (disambiguation) (Spanish spelling)